Kavya Ajit (born 17 July 1991) is an Indian singer, violinist and a live performer born in Kozhikode, Kerala. Apart from Malayalam, she has recorded songs in many Indian languages including Tamil, Telugu and Kannada. Having trained in Carnatic Classical Music and Western classical style of Violin, she has performed in concerts and stage shows across the world.

Early life and education

Kavya was born on 17 July 1991 in Kozhikode to Dr. Ajit Bhaskar, a pulmonologist and Professor at Malabar Medical College and Dr. Lakshmi S, an Associate Professor in gynaecology at Calicut Medical College. She learnt the basics of Carnatic Music from her grandmother Kamala Subrahmaniam, former All India Radio artiste and continued further education and training under Geeta Devi Vasudevan and Madurai Rajaram after moving to Chennai. Hailing from a musically inclined family, Kavya was initiated into Western Violin at an early age and received guidance and mentorship from Albert Vijayan Japheth.

She attended Presentation Higher Secondary School and Silver Hills Public School in Kozhikode. A computer science engineer who graduated from Amrita Vishwa Vidyapeetam, Coimbatore, she has worked at Cognizant Technology Solutions before leaving the job to pursue a career in music. She is married to Vidhyasagar Venkatesan and is currently residing in Chennai.

Career

Kavya stepped into music scene in 2014 with the Ranjan Pramod's romantic musical Rose Guitarinaal. The film's music composer Shahbaz Aman, who was in search for a new voice, liked hers and offered her the song Engum Nalla Pookkal which became her first breakthrough. It was followed by a string of songs tuned by Shaan Rahman for the films Praise the Lord, Oru Vadakkan Selfie and Nam Duniya Nam Style which was her Kannada debut. She was next heard in Lavender, composed by Deepak Dev where she performed two tracks for the film. The soundtrack was lauded for Dev's combination of western music and old-world lyrics.

She debuted in Tamil film music industry through the song Hey Umayaal for the film Urumeen scored by Achu Rajamani.

Her first taste of success came after singing Neeyen Kaataai from the film Jo and the Boy, composed by Rahul Subrahmanian. She received wider recognition following the release of the breezy melody Ee Shishirakalam, tuned by Shaan Rahman for the film Jacobinte Swargarajyam. The song was an instant hit and was praised by critics and audiences alike. In 2016, she made her Telugu debut through the song Jakkanna from the eponymous film. The track was lauded for its grooviness.

In 2017, she lent her vocals for Gopi Sundar's composition Chekkanum Pennum for Omar's second film Chunkzz followed by Agnijwalaa from the Bollywood film Mom for A.R Rahman's Malayalam soundtrack album.

Kavya has performed at numerous Carnatic concerts, Western Vocal and Violin gigs and has shared stage with various artists like A.R Rahman, Karthik, Vijay Prakash, Naresh Iyer, Vineeth Sreenivasan, Stephan Devassy, Shaan Rahman and Gopi Sundar as part of various TV music shows and live performances. She has sung various commercial jingles and has collaborated with artists like Vishal Chandrasekhar, Siddharth Menon, Justin Prabhakaran and Madley Blues for their albums and singles.

Discography

Other Works

References

External links
 
 Facebook

1991 births
Living people
Indian women playback singers
21st-century Indian women classical singers
Indian women pop singers
Malayalam playback singers
Telugu playback singers
Kannada playback singers
Singers from Kerala
Musicians from Kozhikode
Women musicians from Kerala